2,8-Dihydroxyhexahydrochrysene (2,8-DHHHC) is a synthetic, nonsteroidal weak estrogen with approximately 1/2,000th the estrogenic potency of the structurally-related estrogen diethylstilbestrol. It is said to be intermediate in structure between estradiol and hexestrol, but conversely to both of them, is drastically less potent in comparison.

See also
 Tetrahydrochrysene
 Chrysene
 Triphenylethylene
 Estrobin
 Stilbestrol
 Methallenestril
 Ethamoxytriphetol

References

Synthetic estrogens